The Minot State Beavers football team is an NCAA Division II program that represents Minot State University in North Dakota. The Beavers are members of the Northern Sun Intercollegiate Conference and home games are played on campus in Minot at Herb Parker Stadium.

Conferences

Classifications
1955–1969: NAIA
1970–1996: NAIA Division II
1997–2010: NAIA
2011–present: NCAA Division II

Conference affiliations
1925–1930: Independent
1931–1999: North Dakota College Athletic Conference
2000–2010: Dakota Athletic Conference
2011: Division II Independent
2012–present: Northern Sun Intercollegiate Conference

National Playoff appearances

1970
1991
1992 Semi-Finals
1993
1994

2002
2009
2010
2011

Head coaches

NFL players
Quarterback Randy Hedberg of Parshall was selected in the eighth round of the 1977 NFL Draft by the Tampa Bay Buccaneers and started four games as a rookie then was on injured reserve in 1978. He later returned to Minot State as the head coach for eight seasons (1982–1989). Ron Marsh of Plentywood Montana was a 2x all American DE/OLB, played At MSU from (1978-1982) was signed UDF by the Denver Broncos.

References

External links
 

 
American football teams established in 1925
1925 establishments in North Dakota